Under the Acts of Union 1800, with effect from 1 January 1801, there were a 100 MPs representing Ireland in the United Kingdom Parliament. These were divided into 66 constituencies for elections to the United Kingdom Parliament, specified as "two for each County of Ireland, two for the City of Dublin, two for the City of Cork, one for the University of Trinity College, and one for each of the thirty-one most considerable Cities, Towns, and Boroughs":
32 county constituencies, each electing 2 MPs;
33 borough constituencies, each electing 1 MP, except for Cork City and Dublin City, which elected 2 MPs; and
1 university constituency, electing 1 MP.

Under the Representation of the People (Ireland) Act 1832, the total number of seats from Ireland increased to 105, with Belfast, Galway Borough, Limerick City, Waterford City and Dublin University gaining a second seat. There were minor boundary changes to the borough constituencies under the Parliamentary Boundaries (Ireland) Act 1832.

Cashel and Sligo Borough (marked below with an *) were disenfranchised for corruption under the Sligo and Cashel Disfranchisement Act 1870, reducing the number of constituencies to 64 and seats to 103.

In the Redistribution of Seats Act 1885, there was a substantial revision of constituencies, taking a greater account of changes to the population. Most borough constituencies were abolished and county constituencies were divided into single-member districts. These new constituencies were first used at the 1885 United Kingdom general election in Ireland.

List of constituencies

See also 
 List of United Kingdom Parliament constituencies in Ireland and Northern Ireland

References

Ireland, 1801
 
United Kingdom
1801 in Ireland
1801 in politics
Politics of Ireland (1801–1923)